Bernard Morris Dwork (May 27, 1923 – May 9, 1998) was an American mathematician, known for his application of p-adic analysis to local zeta functions, and in particular for a proof of the first part of the Weil conjectures: the rationality of the zeta-function of a variety over a finite field. The general theme of Dwork's research was p-adic cohomology and p-adic differential equations. He published two papers under the pseudonym Maurizio Boyarsky.

Career
Dwork received his Ph.D. at Columbia University in 1954 under direction of Emil Artin (his formal advisor was John Tate); Nick Katz was one of his students.

For his proof of the first part of the Weil conjectures, Dwork received (together with Kenkichi Iwasawa) the Cole Prize in 1962. He received a Guggenheim Fellowship in 1964.

Personal life
Dwork is the father of computer scientist Cynthia Dwork, who received the Dijkstra Prize and is now continuing as a Radcliffe Scholar at Harvard University. His other daughter, historian Deborah Dwork, received a Guggenheim Fellowship in 1993. Additionally, his son Andrew Dwork works as a Professor of Clinical Pathology and Cell Biology (in Psychiatry), at Columbia University, focusing his work on neuropathology of psychiatric disorders.

See also
Dwork family

References

1923 births
1998 deaths
Algebraic geometers
20th-century American mathematicians
Institute for Advanced Study visiting scholars
Columbia University alumni
Princeton University faculty